Kacper Chorążka (born 18 March 1999) is a Polish professional footballer who plays as a goalkeeper for Ermis Aradippou.

Career

At the age of 17, Chorążka trialed for Manchester United, England's most successful club, after trialing for Rangers in Scotland. In 2018, he was sent on loan to Polish second division side Raków Częstochowa from Wisła Kraków in the Polish top flight. Before the second half of the 2018–19 season, he was sent on loan to Polish fourth division team Hutnik Kraków.

In 2019, Chorążka signed for Zagłębie Sosnowiec in the Polish second division, initially on loan, where he made 14 league appearances. On 7 June 2020, he debuted for Zagłębie Sosnowiec during a 2–1 win over Stomil Olsztyn. Before the second half of the 2020–21 season, Chorążka signed for Cypriot top flight outfit Omonia. He made no appearances for the club before being released on 3 June 2022.

On 7 July 2022, he joined Cypriot Second Division side Ermis Aradippou, signing a one-year contract.

References

External links
 
 

Living people
1999 births
Footballers from Kraków
Association football goalkeepers
Polish footballers
Poland youth international footballers
Wisła Kraków players
Raków Częstochowa players
Hutnik Nowa Huta players
Zagłębie Sosnowiec players
AC Omonia players
Ermis Aradippou FC players
I liga players
III liga players
Polish expatriate footballers
Expatriate footballers in Cyprus
Polish expatriate sportspeople in Cyprus